199 Fremont Street is a class-A office skyscraper in South of Market district of San Francisco, California. The , 27-story tower was designed by KMD Architects (Kaplan Mclaughlin Diaz), and completed in 2000.

See also
List of tallest buildings in San Francisco
KMD Architects

References

Office buildings completed in 2000
Skyscraper office buildings in San Francisco
South of Market, San Francisco
Kaplan McLaughlin Diaz buildings